The 2014 Pan American Track Cycling Championships took place at the Velódromo Bicentenario, Aguascalientes, Mexico on September 10–14, 2014.

Medal summary

Men

Women

Records
Pan American records were set in the following events:
 Men's sprint (flying 200m time trial/qualifying round): 9"549 by Fabián Puerta
 Men's 1 km time trial: 59"743 by Ángel Pulgar
 Men's individual pursuit (qualifying round): 4'14"882 by Mauro Agostini
 Men's team pursuit (gold medal final): 3'57"889 by Colombia (Juan Sebastián Molano, Brayan Sánchez, Arles Castro and Jhonatan Restrepo)
 Women's sprint (flying 200m time trial/qualifying round): 10"667 by Juliana Gaviria
 Women's 500m time trial: 33"036 by Lisandra Guerra
 Women's team sprint (gold medal final): 33"263 by Colombia (Diana García and Juliana Gaviria)

Medal table

References

Americas
Cycling
Pan American Track Cycling Championships
Pan American Road and Track Championships
International cycle races hosted by Mexico